Wayne Cashman (born June 24, 1945) is a Canadian former professional ice hockey player and coach. He played seventeen seasons for the Boston Bruins of the National Hockey League (NHL) and helped them win the Stanley Cup twice, and was the last active player who started his NHL career in the Original Six era.

Playing career
Cashman played junior hockey in the OHA with the Oshawa Generals; one of his teammates was Bobby Orr. He played parts of three seasons in the minor leagues for the Oklahoma City Blazers and the Hershey Bears before making the Bruins' squad for good in 1969.

Cashman played his entire NHL career with the Boston Bruins (1964–65, 1967–83). His jersey number was 12. He was a hard-grinding left winger on the era's most formidable forward line with centre Phil Esposito and right wing Ken Hodge. His role was to get into the corners and battle for loose pucks, and feed them to Esposito or Hodge. He was also a tenacious forechecker and served as an enforcer to protect Esposito and Orr. Esposito has regarded Cashman as underrated and not receiving sufficient credit, saying "Wayne was the digger. He was the heart and soul of our line. Without a doubt."

Cashman scored his first NHL goal on November 6, 1968 in Boston's 7-1 home victory over the Philadelphia Flyers.

Cashman was a member of Stanley Cup-winning teams, in 1970 and 1972, and scored twice in the deciding game of the latter finals against the New York Rangers, won by Boston, 3-0. He scored at least 20 goals in a season eight times in his career, doing so in four straight seasons when he also incurred 100 or more penalty minutes. His best season was in 1974, when he finished fourth in the league in points, played in the All-Star Game, and was named to the NHL Second All-Star team.

In 1972 he played for Team Canada in the first four games of the Summit Series. Before the final four games, at an exhibition game in Sweden, Ulf Sterner's stick got lodged in Cashman's mouth, cutting his tongue open. The injury required 50 stitches and kept him out of the rest of the Summit Series.

He served as the captain of the Bruins from 1977 to 1983. When he retired after the Bruins were eliminated from the playoffs in 1983, he was the last active player from the NHL's Original Six era, just beating out Serge Savard, whose team was eliminated in an earlier playoff round.

After his retirement as a player, Cashman served in several coaching positions, including five seasons as an assistant coach for the New York Rangers and four for the Tampa Bay Lightning as an assistant coach. He was appointed head coach of the Philadelphia Flyers for the 1997-98 season and held that post for 61 games until he was replaced by Roger Neilson; he served thereafter as the team's assistant coach. He was also on the coaching staff of Team Canada in the 1998 Olympics in Nagano, Japan, as an assistant to Marc Crawford. He was an assistant coach with the Bruins from 2001 until 2006.

Career statistics

Regular season and playoffs

International

NHL coaching statistics

See also
List of NHL players with 1000 games played
List of NHL players who spent their entire career with one franchise

References

External links

1945 births
Living people
Boston Bruins captains
Boston Bruins coaches
Boston Bruins players
Canadian expatriate ice hockey players in the United States
Canadian ice hockey coaches
Canadian ice hockey right wingers
Canadian people of Irish descent
Hershey Bears players
Ice hockey people from Ontario
National Hockey League assistant coaches
New York Rangers coaches
Oklahoma City Blazers (1965–1977) players
Oshawa Generals players
Philadelphia Flyers coaches
San Jose Sharks coaches
Sportspeople from Kingston, Ontario
Stanley Cup champions
Tampa Bay Lightning coaches